Jasna Boljević (née Tošković; born 16 March 1989) is a Montenegrin female handballer who plays for Rapid București.

International honours
EHF Cup Winners' Cup:
Finalist: 2013
European Championship:
Winner: 2012

References

External links
Jasna Tošković profile at Worldhandball 

1989 births
Living people
Sportspeople from Podgorica
Montenegrin female handball players
Expatriate handball players
Montenegrin expatriate sportspeople in Serbia
Montenegrin expatriate sportspeople in Hungary
Montenegrin expatriate sportspeople in France
Montenegrin expatriate sportspeople in Romania
Békéscsabai Előre NKSE players
Handball players at the 2012 Summer Olympics 
Olympic handball players of Montenegro
Olympic medalists in handball
Olympic silver medalists for Montenegro
Medalists at the 2012 Summer Olympics